Foreign relations exist between Australia and Vietnam. Australia has an embassy in Hanoi and a consulate in Ho Chi Minh City. Vietnam has an embassy in Canberra.

History
While their first contact dated at 19th century as the British Empire was paying attention on colonizing countries in Asia, subsequent French colonization of Vietnam denied formal contact between Vietnam and Australia. Until the end of World War II, relations between Australia and Vietnam were almost non-existent.

Vietnam War and aftermath

Subsequent fear of communist expansionism drew Australia to the eve of Vietnam War, in which Australia participated as part of anti-communist led-intervention to Vietnam to assist South Vietnam against North Vietnam. Australia committed 50,000 troops against the communists, which 520 were killed. The war had a deep effect on Australian society.

Following the end of the Vietnam War, Australia hosted a lot Vietnamese refugees fleeing the country's economic downfall and political isolation. The Vietnamese refugees were the first large group of non-European migrants into Australia following the removal of the  White Australia policy.

Modern days
The end of Cold War and Vietnam's normalization of foreign relations, Australia soon re-approached relationship with Vietnam and eventually established relations at 1990s. Vietnam is now one of the world's fastest growing economies, and Australia's strategic partner, both being members of CPTPP and a popular destination for Australians, many of whom are former soldiers at the Vietnam War. Nonetheless, Australia is also one of the most critical of the violation of human rights in Vietnam done by the communist Government in the country.

Recently, Vietnam has become more reliant in need to Australia's support to counter growing Chinese influence and aggressive attitudes in South China Sea, which at times has prompted anger from the Chinese Government over Australia's attitude.

See also
Foreign relations of Australia 
Foreign relations of Vietnam
Vietnamese Australians

References

External links
Australian Embassy Vietnam
Vietnam Embassy in Australia

 
Vietnam
Bilateral relations of Vietnam